The Five Devils is a 2022 French drama fantasy film directed by Léa Mysius, who wrote the screenplay with Paul Guilhaume. The film stars Adèle Exarchopoulos and Sally Dramé. It screened in the Directors' Fortnight section at the 2022 Cannes Film Festival on 23 May 2022.

Premise
Vicky (Dramé) has a magical gift: she can smell and reproduce any scent of her choosing. She collects these in carefully labelled jars. The solitary child has a very strong bond with her mother Joanne (Exarchopoulos), whose scent she also secretly captures. When her father's sister Julia (Emati) appears into their life, Vicky also begins to reproduce her scent. Julia has recently been released from prison, and Vicky is transported into dark and magical memories which lead her to discover the secrets of her village, her family and her own existence.

Cast
 Adèle Exarchopoulos as Joanne
 Sally Dramé as Vicky
 Swala Emati as Julia
 Moustapha Mbengue as Jimmy
 Daphné Patakia as Nadine
 Patrick Bouchitey as Jean-Yvon	
 Noée Abita

Production
The Five Devils is Léa Mysius's second feature film as director, following Ava in 2017. Mysius co-wrote the film's screenplay with its cinematographer Paul Guilhaume.

The film was produced by Fanny Yvonnet for Trois Brigands Productions and by Jean-Louis Livi for F comme Film, both of whom previously produced Ava. The Five Devils benefited from production support from Auvergne-Rhône-Alpes Cinéma (and support from the Auvergne-Rhône-Alpes region itself), pre-sales from Canal+ and Ciné+, and support from the Île-de-France region.

Filming was set to begin in March 2020, but was interrupted due to the COVID-19 pandemic. Filming resumed in March 2021 and lasted seven weeks. Filming took place in Isère between 1–24 March 2021, in the commune Le Bourg-d'Oisans and at Lac Bleu. Shooting continued in the Île-de-France region, including the Michel-Beaufort swimming pool in Bondy on 31 March and 1 April 2021. Filming wrapped in Paris on 16 April 2021.

Release
The Five Devils was selected to be screened in the Directors' Fortnight section at the 2022 Cannes Film Festival. It had its world premiere at Cannes on 23 May 2022, where it received a five minute standing ovation. It was theatrically released in France on 31 August 2022. French distribution is handled by Le Pacte and international sales are handled by Wild Bunch. In a deal negotiated by Wild Bunch, Mubi acquired The Five Devils for North America, the United Kingdom, Ireland, Latin America, India and Turkey. Mubi is planning a theatrical release in the United States, United Kingdom and Ireland, followed by an exclusive release on its streaming platform.

Reception
On Rotten Tomatoes, the film holds an approval rating of 84% based on 19 reviews, with an average rating of 6.8/10. According to Metacritic, which assigned a weighted average score of 69 out of 100 based on 6 critics, the film received "generally favorable reviews".

Jordan Mintzer of The Hollywood Reporter assessed the film as having too many elements, criticizing screenwriters Mysius and Guilhaume for infusing an "otherwise compelling and intimate tragedy with elements of witchcraft, the supernatural and time travel that feel like they belong in another film — whether it's by Shyamalan or Robert Eggers, or something from the Marvel Cinematic Universe. Rather than enhancing the intrigue, the genre components wind up diluting it, and when the two sides of the movie ultimately come together, the impact feels blunted."

Writing for Deadline, "Valerie Complex was mostly positive on the film, but criticized the way it depicted its Black characters, writing, "There are many movies with Black protagonists at Cannes, but Black people direct none [...] Julia and Jimmy aren't given much agency. They exist as a platform for Joanne, who uses them to elevate herself [...] And the hair. Look, Black hairstylists need to be consulted and hired to give Black characters decent-looking hairstyles. Unkempt hair and bad wigs plague Black actresses on sets, and The Five Devils falls into this trap. Films have to start investing in the complete aesthetic of Blackness, and that means getting people who can bring the most authenticity to a character".

Jake Cole of Slant Magazine praised the film stating it, "feels like the work of a much more seasoned filmmaker" and that Mysius' filmmaking "exudes an exquisite command of atmosphere and aesthetic language".

Accolades

References

External links
 
 

2022 films
2020s French films
2020s French-language films
2022 drama films
2022 fantasy films
2020s fantasy drama films
French fantasy drama films
Films impacted by the COVID-19 pandemic
Wild Bunch (company) films
Films shot in Isère
Films shot in Île-de-France
Films shot in Paris